James Edward Colm "Ted" Farmer (born 21 January 1940 in Rowley Regis) is an English former footballer. He played just four seasons of league football before being forced to retire due to injury aged 24.

Career
Farmer joined Wolves as an amateur in 1956, and after progressing in their reserves, broke into the first team. He scored twice on his senior debut, in a 3–1 win at Manchester United on 24 September 1960.

He ended the season as the club's leading scorer, with 28 goals, as they finished the league in third place. The following season saw him earn a call-up to the England Under-23 side, making a goal scoring debut in a 7–1 win over Israel. He scored a hat trick on his second cap in a 5–2 victory in the Netherlands.

The striker broke his leg shortly afterward though, ending his 1961–62 campaign. Although he returned from his leg break, the next two seasons saw him continually affected by injuries, which ultimately caused him to retire in 1964.

After retiring from playing, Farmer ran a pub in Dudley. He also qualified as a computer programmer and had a very successful career as an analyst/programmer with among other companies The Midlands Electricity Board.

Ted has a unique achievement - he scored his 21st goal on his 21st appearance on his 21st birthday on 21st January (1961) (against Arsenal)

References

1940 births
Living people
People from Rowley Regis
English footballers
England under-23 international footballers
Association football forwards
English Football League players
Wolverhampton Wanderers F.C. players